The Batoque Extractive Reserve is an extractive reserve in the state of Ceará, Brazil.

Location

The Batoque Extractive Reserve is in the municipality of Aquiraz, Ceará.
The environment around the lagoon is fragile, and is threatened by dense occupation of the surrounding land.

The village of Batoque is over 80 years old, founded by residents who fished and grew subsistence crops.
The residents who engage in extractive activities are mainly involved in marine fishery using traditional boats and rafts.
Some also engage in subsistence agriculture, growing crops such as potatoes and cassava.
As of 2015 there were 262 families in the reserve.
They are eligible for quarterly payments of R$300 in exchange for conserving the ecosystems.

History

From the 1970s outsiders began to move into the region around the village.
In 1989 the community founded an association to combat speculators, and in 1999 became engaged in a bitter struggle against a construction company that wanted to built a massive hotel project in the region.
In 2000 the Federal Public Ministry (MPF) agreed to start the process for creating a reserve to protect the land.
The Batoque Extractive Reserve was created by federal decree on 5 June 2003.
It is administered by the Chico Mendes Institute for Biodiversity Conservation (ICMBio).

The reserve is classed as IUCN protected area category VI (protected area with sustainable use of natural resources).
An extractive reserve is an area used by traditional extractive populations whose livelihood is based on extraction, subsistence agriculture and small-scale animal raising.
Its basic objectives are to protect the livelihoods and culture of these people and to ensure sustainable use of natural resources.

On 24 August 2004 the Instituto Nacional de Colonização e Reforma Agrária (INCRA: National Institute for Colonization and Agrarian Reform) recognised the reserve as supporting 230 families of small rural producers, who would qualify for PRONAF support.
The deliberative council was created on 24 May 2012.
On 29 February 2016 a profile of the beneficiary families was published as a basis for discussion of scenarios.

Notes

Sources

 

Protected areas of Ceará
Extractive reserves of Brazil
2003 establishments in Brazil